Ezekiel Massat is a Bougainvillean lawyer and politician. Massat was appointed the Vice President of the Autonomous Region of Bougainville by President James Tanis on January 19, 2009. Bougainville is an autonomous region within Papua New Guinea.

Massat is a lawyer who has previously served as Bougainville's police minister. He represents the Tonu constituency on Buka Island in North Bougainville.

President James Tanis appointed Massat as vice president following pressure by the Central and North Bougainville regions for more inclusion in the Bougainvillaen government. Massat was sworn in as vice president in a ceremony at the Bougainville House of Representatives on the afternoon of January 19, 2009, by senior magistrate Bruce Tasikul. He assumed the vice presidency on the same day as his appointment by Tanis. Massat succeeded John Tabinaman, the  former vice president and who had served as the acting president of Bougainville following the death of Joseph Kabui in June 2008.

Massat will also be responsible for justice and law within the Tanis government.

On 2 October 2020 Massat was appointed Attorney General and Minister of Justice and Post-Referendum Dialogue in the cabinet of Ishmael Toroama.

References 

Vice-presidents of the Autonomous Region of Bougainville
Papua New Guinean lawyers
Living people
Members of the Bougainville House of Representatives
Year of birth missing (living people)
Government ministers of the Autonomous Region of Bougainville
21st-century Papua New Guinean politicians